Vanadium-51 nuclear magnetic resonance (51V NMR spectroscopy) is a method for the characterization of vanadium-containing compounds and materials.  51V comprises 99.75% of naturally occurring element.  The nucleus is quadrupolar with I = 7/2, which is not favorable for NMR spectroscopy.  The quadrupole moment is small, thus the linewidths are small.  The magnetogyric ratio is relatively high (+7.0492  rad T−1s−1), such that 51V has 38% receptivity vs 1H.  Its resonance frequency is close to that of 13C (gyromagnetic ratio = 6.728284 rad T−1s−1).

The chemical shift dispersion is great as illustrated by this series: 0 for VOCl3 (chemical shift standard), −309 for VOCl2(O-i-Pr), −506 VOCl(O-i-Pr)2, and −629 VO(O-i-Pr)3.  For vanadates, the parent orthovanadate and its conjugate acid absorb at −541 ([VO4]3-) and 534 ([HVO4]2-).  For  decavanadate, three shifts are observed in accord with the number of nonequivalent sites: −422, −502, −519.

References

Nuclear magnetic resonance
Vanadium